The Amami thrush (Zoothera major) is a member of the thrush family Turdidae. It is endemic to the islands of Amami Ōshima and Kakeroma island in the northern Nansei Islands of Japan.

Description
This large, heavily patterned thrush is similar in appearance to the scaly thrush, to which was considered a subspecies. It has warm olive-brown to buff upperparts and whitish underparts with heavy black scaling. It has twelve tail feathers. The scaly thrush is smaller and has fourteen tail feathers. It has a cheerful song similar to the Siberian thrush.

Behaviour and ecology
Its breeding habitat is mature subtropical broadleaved evergreen forest around humid valleys. Its diet includes invertebrates and fruit. It breeds in May and June, laying 3-4 eggs.

Status
The breeding population is estimated by Amami Ornithologists' Club (NPO, Japan) all over the island every late March since 1999.

References

External links
BirdLife Species Factsheet

Birds described in 1905
Birds of the Ryukyu Islands
Endemic birds of Japan
Zoothera